1300 (pronounced "one three hundred" are an Australian 5-piece hip-hop group from West Sydney. 

They released their debut studio album, Foreign Language in April 2022.

History

2020-present: Formation and Foreign Language
Prior to 1300, several of the members were in another collective called Aisleland. They met at a listening party for an EP by Yura.

The group released their debut single "Brr" in January 2021, which was followed by "No Caller ID" and "Smashmouth" in the same year.

They released their debut studio album, Foreign Language in April 2022. In a positive review,NME'''s David James Young said "1300 have come out of the gate with a project that should propel them beyond their immediate bubble of Australian hip-hop – and possibly into the list of Australian artists who've put out the best music of 2022."

On 10 February 2023, the group released the mix tape <3 (pronounced "less than three").

Discography
Albums

Mix Tapes

Awards and nominations
Australian Music Prize
The Australian Music Prize (the AMP) is an annual award of $30,000 given to an Australian band or solo artist in recognition of the merit of an album released during the year of award. It exists to discover, reward and promote new Australian music of excellence.

!  
|-
| 2022
| Foreign Language''
| Australian Music Prize
| 
| 
|-

J Awards
The J Awards are an annual series of Australian music awards that were established by the Australian Broadcasting Corporation's youth-focused radio station Triple J. They commenced in 2005.

! 
|-
! scope="row"| 2021
| 1300
| Unearthed Artist of the Year
| 
| 
|-
! scope="row"| 2022
| "oldboy" by 1300 (directed by Raghav Rampal)
| Australian Video of the Year
| 
| 
|}

References

Musical groups from Sydney
Musical groups established in 2020
2020 establishments in Australia